Sandra Grau Muxella (born 27 April 1970) is an Andorran alpine skier. She competed in three events at the 1988 Winter Olympics.

She is the sister of alpine skier Vicky Grau.

Notes

References

External links
 
 
 

1970 births
Living people
Andorran female alpine skiers
Olympic alpine skiers of Andorra
Alpine skiers at the 1988 Winter Olympics
Place of birth missing (living people)